

Oman
 Mombasa – Nasr ibn Abdallah al-Mazru‘i, Wali of Mombasa (1698–1728)

Ottoman Empire
 Principality of Abkhazia – Jigetshi (1700–1730)

Portugal
 Angola –
 Luís César de Meneses, Governor of Angola (1697–1701)
 Bernardino de Tavora de Sousa Távares, Governor of Angola (1701–1702)
 Macau – Diogo de Melo Sampaio, Governor of Macau (1700–1702)

1701